Samuel Marchbanks' Almanack, published by McClelland and Stewart in 1967, is the third and last of the Samuel Marchbanks books by Canadian novelist and journalist Robertson Davies. The other two books in this series are The Diary of Samuel Marchbanks (1947) and The Table Talk of Samuel Marchbanks (1949). Davies' writings as Samuel Marchbanks were also collected in a one-volume edition, The Papers of Samuel Marchbanks in 1985.

Background
Davies created the Samuel Marchbanks character whilst editor of the Peterborough Examiner newspaper in the small city of Peterborough, Ontario, northeast of Toronto. He wrote the first column under the Marchbanks pseudonym in 1944.

Davies first started work on Samuel Marchbanks' Almanack in 1953, but the manuscript was rejected by his publisher, Clarke Irwin. Davies filed the rejected manuscript away, not to return to it for a decade. He resubmitted it for publication in 1966, this time choosing McClelland and Stewart as the prospective publisher. The book is presented in the form of an almanac, based on the signs of the Zodiac.

Short story collections by Robertson Davies
1967 short story collections
McClelland & Stewart books